The Blue Dahlia is a 1946 American crime film and film noir with an original screenplay by Raymond Chandler directed by George Marshall and starring Alan Ladd, Veronica Lake and William Bendix. It was Chandler's first original screenplay.

Plot
Three demobilized United States Navy aviators, Johnny Morrison, Buzz Wanchek, and George Copeland, arrive in Hollywood, California. All three flew together in the same flight crew from Kwajalein Atoll in the South Pacific. Buzz has shell shock and a metal plate in his head above his ear.

While George and Buzz get an apartment together, Johnny surprises his wife, Helen, at her hotel bungalow where she is hosting a riotous party with many drunken revellers. Johnny discovers that Helen is having an affair with Eddie Harwood, the owner of the Blue Dahlia nightclub on the Sunset Strip. Johnny punches Eddie as he leaves and then apologizes for losing his temper. The party ends and everybody leaves. Helen, drunk, confesses to Johnny that their son, Dickie, who Johnny believed died of diphtheria, actually died in a car crash that happened because she was driving while drunk. Johnny and Helen scuffle, which is witnessed by the hotel detective, "Dad" Newell. Johnny decides to leave. He pulls a gun on Helen, states 'that's what you deserve,' but drops the gun on a chair and leaves.

Buzz goes out to find Johnny at his hotel bungalow. He meets Helen Morrison in the hotel bar and, unaware of her identity, goes to her bungalow for a drink to wait for Mrs Morrison.

Helen rings Eddie who breaks up with her over the phone. However, she then blackmails him into seeing her again. Eddie visits Helen at her bungalow; this is witnessed by the hotel detective.

Johnny is picked up by Joyce Harwood (who is driving to Malibu) while walking in the rain. She is estranged from Eddie. Neither reveals their names. Although attracted to each other, they part ways and Johnny spends the night in a beach-side inn. The next morning, at the same inn, Joyce sees Johnny at breakfast and reveals that she stayed at the same inn. They decide to walk on the beach to look for moonstones. Whilst purchasing a bus ticket for Los Angeles, Johnny hears the radio announce that Helen has been murdered and that Johnny is suspected. He then quickly leaves to board a bus.

The police interview Newell, Harwood, Buzz, and George.

After Johnny checks in to a cheap hotel in Los Angeles under an assumed name, Corelli, the hotel manager, finds Johnny's framed photo of himself with Dickie and tries to blackmail him. Johnny punches Corelli out, smashing the frame in the process; he discovers on the back of the photo that Helen has written an insurance note revealing that Eddie is really Bauer, a murderer who is wanted in New Jersey.

Corelli revives and sells information on Johnny's identity to a gangster named Leo (the nightclub partner of Eddie), who then kidnaps Johnny when he visits George and Buzz.

Buzz and George visit Eddie at the Blue Dahlia. Joyce, who has agreed to meet Eddie, introduces herself. As Joyce picks at a blue dahlia flower, the nightclub's music sets off a painful ring in Buzz's head. Lapsing into a fit, he remembers the agonizing music that he heard at Helen's bungalow, as she played with a blue dahlia.

Johnny escapes Leo and his side-kick, knocking them both out just before Eddie arrives. They talk and Eddie admits with regret that, fifteen years earlier, he was involved in the shooting of a bank messenger.

Leo comes around and tries to shoot Johnny, but during a scuffle, he shoots Eddie instead. Johnny ends up shooting Leo and flees to the Blue Dahlia, where the police are trying to force a confused Buzz to admit that he killed Helen.

Johnny enters and suggests that Joyce turn up the jazz music that Buzz hates. As his head pounds, Buzz remembers leaving Helen alive in her bungalow. Newell tries to shift suspicion towards George, then attempts to leave as Police Captain Hendrickson confronts Newell with the accusation that he tried to blackmail Helen about her affair, and that he killed her when she refused to comply. Newell then tries to escape from the office but is shot dead by Hendrickson when he pulls his own gun.

Later, outside the Blue Dahlia, Buzz and George decide to go for a drink, leaving Johnny and Joyce together.

Cast

 Alan Ladd as Johnny Morrison
 Veronica Lake as Joyce Harwood
 William Bendix as Buzz Wanchek
 Howard da Silva as Eddie Harwood
 Doris Dowling as Helen Morrison
 Hugh Beaumont as George Copeland
 Tom Powers as Captain Hendrickson
 Howard Freeman as Corelli
 Don Costello as Leo
 Will Wright as "Dad" Newell
 Frank Faylen as man recommending motel
 Walter Sande as Heath

Uncredited performances include Mae Busch as Jenny the maid, Anthony Caruso as a corporal playing a jukebox, and Noel Neill as Nolie the hatcheck girl.

Production

Development
In 1945 Alan Ladd was one of Paramount's top stars. He had served for ten months in the army in 1943 before being honorably discharged due to illness; however, he had recently been reclassified 1-A for the military draft, and he might have had to go back into the Army. Paramount kept applying for deferments so he could make films but Ladd was due for induction in May 1945.

The studio wanted to make a movie starring him before that happened, but had nothing suitable. Producer John Houseman knew Raymond Chandler from having collaborated on Paramount's The Unseen, which Houseman produced and Chandler rewrote. Houseman says Chandler had started a novel but was "stuck" and was considering turning it into a screenplay for the movies instead. Houseman read the 120 pages Chandler had written and, within 48 hours, it was sold to Paramount. Houseman would produce it under the supervision of Joseph Sistrom.

It was the first original script for the screen that Chandler had ever written. He wrote the first half of the script in under six weeks and sent it to Paramount. Delighted, the studio arranged for filming to start in three weeks' time.

Paramount announced the film in February 1945, with Ladd, Lake, Bendix and Marshall (the director) all attached from the beginning. Houseman said George Marshall had a reputation for rewriting extensively on the set and had to persuade him to stick to the script. (Marshall said he was so impressed with the writing he never had any intention of rewriting.)

Houseman recalled that Ladd was unhappy with the casting of Doris Dowling as his wife because she was half a foot taller than he but this was disguised during their scenes together.

Shooting
Shooting began in March 1945 without a completed screenplay. Houseman was not worried initially because of his confidence in Chandler. He says four weeks into filming the studio began to worry as they were running out of script. "We had shot sixty-two pages in four weeks; Chandler, during that time, had turned in only twenty-two—with another thirty to go."

The problem was the ending. Originally, Chandler intended the killer to be Buzz having a blackout. However, the Navy did not want a serviceman to be portrayed as a murderer, and Paramount told Chandler that he had to come up with a new ending. Chandler responded at first with writer's block. Paramount offered Chandler a $5,000 incentive to finish the script, which did not work, according to Houseman:It was the front-office calculation, I suppose, that by dangling this fresh carrot before Chandler's nose they were executing a brilliant and cunning maneuver. They did not know their man. They succeeded, instead, in disturbing him in three distinct and separate ways: One, his faith in himself was destroyed. By never letting Ray share my apprehensions, I had convinced him of my confidence in his ability to finish the script on time. This sense of security was now hopelessly shattered. Two, he had been insulted. To Ray, the bonus was nothing but a bribe. To be offered a large additional sum of money for the completion of an assignment for which he had already contracted and which he had every intention of fulfilling was by his standards a degradation and a dishonor. Three, by going to him behind my back they had invited him to betray a friend and fellow Public School man. The way the interview had been conducted ('sneakily') filled Ray with humiliation and rage.
Chandler wanted to quit, but Houseman convinced him to sleep on it. The next day, Chandler said he would be able to finish the film if he resumed drinking. Houseman said that the writer's requirements were "two Cadillac limousines, to stand day and night outside the house with drivers available", "six secretaries", and "a direct line open at all times to my office by day, to the studio switchboard at night and to my home at all times." Houseman agreed and says Chandler then started drinking:

[Chandler] did not minimize the hazards [of drinking]", said Houseman in 1964, "He pointed out that his plan... would call for deep faith on my part and supreme courage on his, since he would in effect be completing the script at the risk of his life. (It wasn't the drinking that was dangerous, he explained, since he had a doctor who gave him such massive injections of glucose that he could last for weeks with no solid food at all. It was the sobering up that was parlous; the terrible strain of his return to normal living)."

At the end of that time, Chandler presented the finished script.

Chandler was unhappy with the forced ending, saying it made "a routine whodunnit out of a fairly original idea." He also disliked the performance of Lake. "The only times she's good is when she keeps her mouth shut and looks mysterious", he told a friend. "The moment she tries to behave as if she had a brain she falls flat on her face. The scenes we had to cut out because she loused them up! And there are three godawful close shots of her looking perturbed that make me want to throw my lunch over the fence."

Chandler received a lot of deference on the set, but Lake was not familiar with him so, upon asking about him and being told, "He's the greatest mystery writer around", she made a point of listening intently to an analysis of his work by the film's publicity director to impress newspaper reporters with her knowledge of a writer she had never read. Chandler developed an intense dislike for Lake and referred to her as "Moronica Lake".

Lake later said about her role, "I'm not much of a motivating force, but the part is good."

By May 1945, the government ruled that all men aged 30 or over would be released from the obligation to go back into the Army. Ladd did not have to re-enlist after all.

Reception

Box office
It was one of the most popular films at the British box office in 1946.

Critical response
The staff at Variety magazine gave the film a positive review and wrote:

Playing a discharged naval flier returning home from the Pacific first to find his wife unfaithful, then to find her murdered and himself in hiding as the suspect, Alan Ladd does a bangup job. Performance has a warm appeal, while in his relentless track down of the real criminal, Ladd has a cold, steel-like quality that is potent. Fight scenes are stark and brutal, and tremendously effective.

Critic Dennis Schwartz wrote:

A fresh smelling film noir directed with great skill by George Marshall from the screenplay of Raymond Chandler (the only one he ever wrote for the screen, his other films were adapted from his novels). It eschews moral judgment in favor of a hard-boiled tale that flaunts its flowery style as its way of swimming madly along in LA's postwar boom and decadence.
Diabolique called it "a fantastic film noir, full of atmosphere, intrigue, crackling dialogue and sensational performances, which was recognized as a classic almost immediately and made a tonne of money."

The film review aggregator website Rotten Tomatoes reports that 100% of its critics gave the film a positive review, based on 11 reviews.

Awards and honors
Chandler was nominated for the Academy Award for Best Original Screenplay.

Adaptations
The Blue Dahlia was dramatized as a half-hour radio play on the April 21, 1949 broadcast of The Screen Guild Theater, starring Lake and Ladd in their original film roles. The movie was also adapted into a stage play in 1989.

Houseman's narrative of the film's creation was dramatized for BBC Radio by Ray Connolly in 2009.

References
Notes

Bibliography

External links
 
 
 
 
 Review of film at New York Times − (archive)
 Review of film at Variety

Streaming audio
 The Blue Dahlia on Screen Guild Theater: April 21, 1949

1946 films
1940s crime thriller films
American crime thriller films
American black-and-white films
Film noir
Films scored by Victor Young
Films directed by George Marshall
Films set in Los Angeles
Paramount Pictures films
Films with screenplays by Raymond Chandler
Films about infidelity
1940s English-language films
1940s American films